Periódico La Esquina is a newspaper in Puerto Rico which is only available in the east part of the island.

See also
 List of newspapers in Puerto Rico

References

External links

Spanish-language newspapers published in Puerto Rico
Publications with year of establishment missing